Joseph Lephmon Pennington (January 15, 1928 – July 1, 2020), also known as Joe Penny, was an American musician, the former lead guitarist for Hank Williams' backing band, the Drifting Cowboys. After leaving the Drifting Cowboys in 1949, Pennington went on to perform with Lefty Frizzell and record several rockabilly singles on the Federal Records label in the mid-1950s as "Joe Penny". Pennington is inducted in the Rockabilly Hall of Fame. He was born in Plant City, Florida, United States.

Discography
 1958 - "Bip A Little, Bop A Lot" b/w "Mercy, Mercy, Percy" (Federal 12322)

References

Rockabilly Hall of Fame biography
AllMusic biography
Joe Penny discography on RCS
Is Joe Pennington The Last Drifting Cowboy?

1928 births
2020 deaths
American country guitarists
American male guitarists
American rockabilly musicians
Federal Records artists
People from Plant City, Florida
20th-century American guitarists
Country musicians from Florida
20th-century American male musicians
Drifting Cowboys members